Coke County is a county located on the Edwards Plateau in the U.S. state of Texas. As of the 2020 census, its population was 3,285. Its county seat is Robert Lee. The county was founded in 1889 and is named for Richard Coke, the 15th governor of Texas. Coke County was one of 46 prohibition, or entirely dry, counties in the state of Texas, but passed a law allowing the sale of beer and wine in 2005.

History

Native Americans

From about 1700 to the 1870s, Comanche, Tonkawa, Lipan Apache, Kickapoo, and Kiowa roamed the county.  These tribes settled in rock shelters in the river and creek valleys, leaving behind artifacts and caches of seeds, implements, burial sites, petroglyphs, river shells, turkey and deer bones, flint knives, scrapers, and points.

Early years

In 1851, United States Army post Fort Chadbourne was established to protect the frontier, and the fort was manned until the Civil War. The Butterfield Overland Mail ran through the area from 1858 to 1861.

Between 1860 and the early 1880s, the only settlers in what became Coke County were ranchers attracted to open grazing land. J. J. Austin established his ranch headquarters near Sanco  in 1875.  Pate Francher settled in the area in 1877.

In 1882, the Texas and Pacific Railway began providing service to San Angelo, and settlers started coming into the region in somewhat larger numbers.

Severe drought in the 1880s led to fence cutting and its attendant issues. State authorities eventually settled the disputes.

A few years later, the county was named after Confederate soldier, Texas leader, governor, and U.S senator Richard Coke.

County history

The Texas Legislature established Coke County in 1889, out of Tom Green County. The county was organized that same year, with Hayrick  as county seat.  The county's first newspaper, the Hayrick Democrat, began publication in 1889, but was renamed the Rustler.

In 1891, after an election, the new town of Robert Lee became the county seat.  Robert E. Lee had once served at Fort Chadbourne.  That same year, the county's newspaper moved to the new county seat and was renamed the Robert Lee Observer.

Dr. D.W. Key  started the town of Bronte, named after English writer Charlotte Brontë. The town was originally named Oso and then Bronco.  A post office was granted in 1890 after residents changed the name to Bronte.

Silver, named after Silver Peak Summit, was settled between 1870 and 1880 as a ranching hub. Early settlers were S.M. Conner, R.B. Allen, W.G. Jameson, and W.R. Walker. Dr. Joseph Eaton Reed was for 50 years the only physician. Oil discovery and related industries created a boom in Silver in the mid-20th century.  After the oil camps closed down in 1966, Silver's population slipped drastically.

Tennyson, named in honor of the British poet Alfred, Lord Tennyson was established in 1892. It received a post office two years later.

The Kansas City, Mexico and Orient Railway built tracks north from San Angelo in 1907, which benefited Tennyson, Bronte, and Fort Chadbourne.

Cotton acreage peaked in 1910, but plunged sharply during the 1920s, because of a boll weevil infestation.  Expanding during the same period was the production of corn, wheat, sorghum, and fruit trees.  The county population declined during the Great Depression.

Oil was discovered in the county in 1942, and by 1991,  had been taken from Coke County lands. Tax money derived from oil profits helped the county to improve infrastructure and public facilities and services for its citizens.  Oil production accounts for the major share of income for the county.

In 1995 Louis Jones murdered United States Army soldier Tracie Joy McBride in Coke County after having kidnapped her from Goodfellow Air Force Base in San Angelo, Texas.

Geography

Major highways
  U.S. Highway 277
  State Highway 158
  State Highway 208

Adjacent counties
 Nolan County (north)
 Runnels County (east)
 Tom Green County (south)
 Sterling County (west)
 Mitchell County (northwest)

Demographics

Note: the US Census treats Hispanic/Latino as an ethnic category. This table excludes Latinos from the racial categories and assigns them to a separate category. Hispanics/Latinos can be of any race.

At the 2000 census, 3,864 people, 1,544 households and 1,068 families resided in the county. The population density was four per square mile (2/km2). The 2,843 housing units averaged three per square mile. The racial makeup of the county was 88.85% White, 1.94% Black or African American, 0.78% Native American, 0.08% Asian, 0.03% Pacific Islander, 6.94% from other races] and 1.40% from two or more races. About 16.90% of the population was Hispanic or Latino of any race.

Of the 1,544 households, 27.10% had children under the age of 18 living with them, 58.40% were married couples living together, 8.10% had a female householder with no husband present, and 30.80% were not families; 29.00% of all households was made up of individuals, and 18.30% had someone living alone who was 65 years of age or older. The average household size was 2.31, and the average family size was 2.84.

Age distribution was 24.40% under the age of 18, 7.50% from 18 to 24, 20.50% from 25 to 44, 23.60% from 45 to 64, and 24.10% who were 65 years of age or older. The median age was 43 years. For every 100 females, there were 100.00 males. For every 100 females age 18 and over, there were 94.20 males.

The median household income was $29,085, and the median family was $36,724. Males had a median income of $30,778 versus $19,596 for females. The per capita income for the county was $16,734.  About 9.70% of families and 13.00% of the population were below the poverty line, including 15.00% of those under age 18 and 12.80% of those age 65 or over.

Communities

Cities
 Blackwell (mostly in Nolan County)
 Robert Lee (county seat)

Town
 Bronte

Unincorporated communities
 Sanco
 Silver
 Tennyson

Ghost town
 Edith
 Juniper

Politics

See also

 National Register of Historic Places listings in Coke County, Texas
 Recorded Texas Historic Landmarks in Coke County

References

External links
 Coke County government's website
 Coke County in Handbook of Texas Online
 Coke County Profile from the Texas Association of Counties

 
1889 establishments in Texas
Populated places established in 1889